Charlevoix-Est is a regional county municipality in the Capitale-Nationale region of Quebec, Canada. The seat is Clermont.

Subdivisions
There are 9 subdivisions within the RCM:

Cities & Towns (2)
 Clermont
 La Malbaie

Municipalities (5)
 Baie-Sainte-Catherine
 Notre-Dame-des-Monts
 Saint-Aimé-des-Lacs
 Saint-Irénée
 Saint-Siméon

Unorganized Territory (2)
 Mont-Élie
 Sagard

Demographics

Population

Language

Transportation

Access Routes
Highways and numbered routes that run through the municipality, including external routes that start or finish at the county border:

 Autoroutes
 None

 Principal Highways
 
 

 Secondary Highways
 

 External Routes
 None

See also
 List of regional county municipalities and equivalent territories in Quebec

References

External links
 official website (in French)